Joshua Javon Johnson (born May 15, 1986) is an American football quarterback who is currently a free agent. During his 15 years in the NFL, Johnson has been a member of 14 different teams. He also played in the United Football League (UFL), the Alliance of American Football (AAF), and the XFL.

Johnson played college football at San Diego and was selected by the Tampa Bay Buccaneers in the fifth round of the 2008 NFL Draft. Primarily a backup during his career, he started for the Buccaneers, Washington Redskins, and Baltimore Ravens, while also seeing playing time with the Cleveland Browns, Cincinnati Bengals, New York Jets, and the 49ers. His longest stint has been with the Buccaneers, where he spent his first four years, and his tenures with other teams have mostly lasted no longer than one season.

Early years
Johnson attended Oakland Technical High School and was a letterman in football, basketball, and track & field. In football, as a senior, he was named the team's Most Improved Player, was a first-team All-City selection, and led his team to the Oakland Athletic League Championship. He was also a teammate of cousin Marshawn Lynch.

College career

2004–2005
Josh Johnson enrolled at University of San Diego in 2004, where he played backup quarterback to Todd Mortensen. He finished with 135 yards on the season.

Johnson earned the starting job after Mortensen's departure for the 2005 season and earned some All-America honors after breaking numerous records. Johnson, who earned three conference player of the week honors, totaled eight games with four or more passing touchdowns. His best game of the season came against Valparaiso, when he threw for a school-record seven touchdowns (all coming in the first half). He also had five touchdowns and 375 yards against Morehead State in the Pioneer Football League Championship victory. Johnson finished the season with 3,256 yards and 36 touchdowns, completing 70.1% of his passes en route to being named team MVP.

2006
After his record-setting sophomore season, Johnson was named third-team Associated Press All-America on his junior season. He was also named PFL Offensive Player of the Year as he led San Diego to a 10–0 start. He also led San Diego to their first Top 25 appearance in school history. Johnson finished his season with 3,320 yards and 34 touchdowns passing, and 720 yards and 11 touchdowns rushing. He led the FCS in total offense, passing efficiency, passing yards, and points responsible for. Johnson totaled four games with over 300 yards passing, while his season-best was a 384-yard performance against Jacksonville. Johnson also had a 25-yard reception touchdown on the season. In the victory over Jacksonville, Johnson also set a school-record with 470 total yards of offense. Johnson finished 6th in the voting for the Walter Payton Award, for the best player in the FCS.

2007
After two tremendous seasons, Johnson entered the 2007 season on the Walter Payton Award watchlist and as a Preseason All-American. In Johnson's first game of the season, he passed for 403 yards and 4 touchdowns. He then followed it up with two straight games of six touchdowns. Against Davidson College, Johnson passed for a career-high 428 yards and 6 touchdowns. Johnson finished the season with 2,988 yards and a school-record 43 touchdowns passing, one interception, and a career-high 726 yards and two touchdowns rushing. Johnson finished the season as the school's record-holder in career touchdown passes and passing yards; he already owned the school record for career completions. Johnson finished the season by being named a third-team FCS All-American and a Payton Award finalist. Johnson holds the record for the highest career passer efficiency (176.68) in NCAA Division-I football history. He finished third in voting for the Walter Payton Award behind winner Jayson Foster.

After his senior football season, Johnson was invited to play in the 2008 East–West Shrine Game in Houston, Texas, and was named the game's Offensive MVP after finishing the game with 5 completions out of 11 pass attempts for 78 yards and a touchdown and 103 rushing yards on three attempts.

Career statistics

Professional career
Despite his small school background, Johnson had his name on many teams’ draft boards. He was aided by his impressive NFL Combine performances, in which he posted the best 40-yard dash time (4.53) and vertical jump of any quarterback in the 2008 NFL Combine. He was drafted by the Tampa Bay Buccaneers with the 25th pick of the fifth round (160th overall) in 2008 NFL Draft. He has been referred to as a classic journeyman quarterback for his stints with 15 different NFL teams.

Tampa Bay Buccaneers

2009
Johnson made his first appearance in a regular season NFL game on September 27, 2009, at Tampa's Raymond James Stadium against the New York Giants. When Johnson replaced Byron Leftwich as Tampa Bay's quarterback with 9:33 remaining, the Buccaneers had accumulated only 35 total yards and one first down against the favored Giants. Taking his first pro snap, Johnson found Antonio Bryant for 6 yards, marking the afternoon's first reception by a Tampa Bay wide receiver. Johnson ran for 15 yards and added three more completions for 30 yards as the Buccaneers finished with 86 yards in a 24–0 loss. Johnson drove the Buccaneers from their own 24 to the New York five-yard line in his only possession. One of Johnson's passes zipped through Michael Clayton's hands in the end zone.

2010
Johnson was named the starting quarterback on September 28, 2010, and earned his first career start on October 4, 2010, in a 16–13 loss to Washington. He threw his first career touchdown pass to Antonio Bryant on his first pass of the game. During the 2010 season, Johnson notched a 95.6 passer rating as backup quarterback, and also made appearances in the offense's wildcat formation. Johnson was a backup to Josh Freeman in 2010, completing 14 of 16 passes for 111 yards.

2011
On December 4, 2011, Johnson started in place of the injured Josh Freeman against the Carolina Panthers. Johnson completed 16 of his 27 passing attempts with 229 passing yards, one touchdown pass, and one interception. Tampa Bay lost the game 38–19. He also made a brief appearance the following week, but attempted only two passes, one for three yards, and the other an interception.

San Francisco 49ers
On March 24, 2012, Johnson signed a two-year deal with the San Francisco 49ers, reuniting with his coach from the University of San Diego, Jim Harbaugh. On August 31, 2012, Johnson was one of 21 players cut as the 49ers trimmed their roster to the 53-man limit for the regular season.

Johnson tried out for the Chicago Bears on December 12, 2012.

Sacramento Mountain Lions
Johnson played for the Sacramento Mountain Lions of the United Football League in 2012. Johnson played in 2 games before the league folded.

Cleveland Browns
On December 26, 2012, the Cleveland Browns announced they signed Johnson after injuries to Brandon Weeden and Colt McCoy. After an injury to starter Thad Lewis, Johnson played for one snap in a Week 17 loss to the Pittsburgh Steelers. The single snap resulted in a sack fumble.

Cincinnati Bengals

On March 21, 2013, Johnson signed with the Cincinnati Bengals. He was released on May 12, 2014.

San Francisco 49ers (second stint)
Johnson signed with the San Francisco 49ers in May 2014. He was released on September 20, 2014, re-signed on September 23, released again on October 10, 2014, and re-signed on October 14, 2014. Johnson was repeatedly signed and released to give the 49ers a 54th roster spot.

Cincinnati Bengals (second stint)
Johnson was signed by the Cincinnati Bengals on April 2, 2015. He was released on August 25, 2015.

New York Jets
Johnson signed with the New York Jets on August 27, 2015. He was released by the Jets on September 5, 2015.

Indianapolis Colts
On October 2, 2015, Johnson signed with the Indianapolis Colts due to an injury to starter Andrew Luck. He was released on October 5, 2015. but subsequently re-signed on October 7, 2015, and was released yet again on October 12, 2015.

Buffalo Bills
On October 13, 2015, Johnson signed with the Buffalo Bills.

Baltimore Ravens
Johnson signed with the Baltimore Ravens on May 15, 2016. Johnson was released by the Ravens on September 3, 2016.

New York Giants
Johnson was signed by the New York Giants on September 5, 2016. Johnson was active for only two games during the regular season due to injuries to backup quarterback Ryan Nassib.

On March 17, 2017, Johnson signed a two-year contract with the Giants. On September 2, 2017, Johnson was released by the Giants during preseason cuts.

Houston Texans
Johnson was signed by the Houston Texans on November 7, 2017, after the release of Matt McGloin. He was released by the Texans on November 22, 2017. He was re-signed on December 27, 2017, after an injury to Taylor Heinicke.

Oakland Raiders
On March 19, 2018, Johnson signed with the Oakland Raiders. He was released by the team on May 10, 2018.

San Diego Fleet
In 2018, Johnson was assigned to the San Diego Fleet of the Alliance of American Football. In November, he was protected by the team in the 2019 AAF QB Draft with the first overall pick. Shortly after, Johnson was signed by the Washington Redskins before the AAF season began.

Washington Redskins
On December 5, 2018, Johnson signed a one-year contract with the Washington Redskins to be a backup to Mark Sanchez after season-ending injuries to Colt McCoy and Alex Smith. Johnson said he played a Madden NFL video game to help learn the names of his new teammates.

On December 9, 2018, Johnson appeared in his first game after Sanchez was benched against the New York Giants in the third quarter of a 40–16 loss. It was Johnson's first appearance in an NFL game since 2013 with the Cincinnati Bengals. He finished the game completing 11 passes from 16 attempts for 195 yards, one touchdown (his first touchdown since 2011 with the Buccaneers) and an interception. He also rushed for 45 yards and his first career rushing touchdown on seven attempts. After the game, it was announced that Johnson would be the starter for the next game against the Jacksonville Jaguars. The game resulted in a 16–13 victory, his first career win as a starting quarterback in the NFL. The following game, on December 22, 2018, Johnson and the Redskins faced the Tennessee Titans in a crucial Week 16 match-up to maintain their playoff hopes. Despite leading for most of the game, Washington's defense allowed a costly go-ahead touchdown with about four minutes remaining in the fourth quarter. Down 19–16, Johnson attempted to lead the Redskins down the field for a potential game-tying drive, but was intercepted first by safety Kevin Byard and then by Malcolm Butler after the Redskins managed to get the ball back with 14 seconds remaining. Washington would go on to lose 25–16, essentially ending their playoff chances. Johnson finished 13-of-23 with 153 yards, 1 touchdown, and 2 interceptions. He started the Week 17 finale against the Philadelphia Eagles. He passed for 91 yards and an interception in the 24–0 loss. He had ankle surgery after the season and was unable to return to the San Diego Fleet when his contract with the team expired.

Detroit Lions
On August 10, 2019, Johnson was signed by the Detroit Lions. He was active the first 2 games as the backup up to Matthew Stafford, but was released after the signing of Jeff Driskel on September 17, 2019.

Los Angeles Wildcats
On November 22, 2019, Johnson was allocated to the Los Angeles Wildcats of the XFL as part of the 2020 XFL Supplemental Draft. On November 25, 2019, the Detroit Lions tried to re-sign Johnson but the XFL did not allow him to leave his contract with the Wildcats. Despite the Wildcats finishing 2–3 in the 5 game COVID-19 pandemic shortened season in 2020, Johnson performed admirably in 4 games (missing week 1 with an injury) by converting 60% of his passes, completing 81 out of 135 attempts for 1,076 yards for 11 touchdowns against only 2 interceptions for a QB rating of 106.3. As a result, Johnson was named the highest graded quarterback in the XFL by Pro Football Focus. He had his contract terminated when the league suspended operations on April 10, 2020.

San Francisco 49ers (third stint)
Johnson was signed to the San Francisco 49ers' practice squad on November 11, 2020. He was placed on the practice squad/COVID-19 list by the team on December 22, 2020, and restored to the practice squad on December 31, 2020. He signed a reserve/future contract on January 15, 2021. On June 1, 2021, Johnson was released by the 49ers.

New York Jets (second stint)
On August 4, 2021, Johnson signed with the New York Jets. He was released on August 31, 2021, and re-signed to the practice squad the next day. After starting quarterback Zach Wilson suffered a sprained posterior cruciate ligament in Week 7, Johnson was elevated to the active roster as the second option behind Mike White. While White was being evaluated for a potential injury in the following week's game against the Cincinnati Bengals, Johnson took the field during the third quarter, his first NFL appearance since 2018. He completed 2 of 4 passes for 17 yards, setting up a game-tying field goal, before White returned on New York's next possession. The Jets subsequently won 34–31. In the Week 9 matchup against the Indianapolis Colts, Johnson again relieved an injured White during the Jets second drive. He threw for a career high 317 passing yards and three touchdowns, but was also intercepted on New York's final drive in the 30–45 defeat. He was reverted to the Jets' practice squad following the game against the Colts.

Baltimore Ravens (second stint)
On December 15, 2021, Johnson was signed from the Jets' practice squad by the Baltimore Ravens. He was forced into the starting role in Week 16 against the Cincinnati Bengals due to Lamar Jackson having an ankle injury and Tyler Huntley testing positive for COVID-19. He went 28 for 40 for 304 yards and two touchdowns and an interception and also rushed for 10 yards, but the Ravens lost the game 21–41.

Denver Broncos
On March 18, 2022, Johnson signed with the Denver Broncos. He was released on August 30, 2022, and signed to the practice squad the next day. On October 22, 2022, Johnson was elevated to the team's active roster following an injury to starting quarterback Russell Wilson.

San Francisco 49ers (fourth stint)
On December 4, 2022, Johnson was signed to the 49ers active roster after a foot injury to quarterback Jimmy Garoppolo. On January 29, 2023, Johnson played in the NFC Championship Game against the Philadelphia Eagles in relief of injured quarterback Brock Purdy, who tore his ulnar collateral ligament. Johnson exited the game after sustaining a concussion in the third quarter and was replaced by the injured Purdy. He completed 7 passes on 13 attempts for 74 yards with a lost fumble in the 31–7 loss.

Career statistics

UFL career statistics

XFL career statistics

NFL career statistics

Regular season

Postseason

References

External links

 San Francisco 49ers bio
 San Diego Toreros bio

1986 births
Living people
African-American players of American football
American football quarterbacks
Baltimore Ravens players
Buffalo Bills players
Cincinnati Bengals players
Cleveland Browns players
Denver Broncos players
Detroit Lions players
Houston Texans players
Indianapolis Colts players
Los Angeles Wildcats (XFL) players
New York Giants players
New York Jets players
Oakland Raiders players
Players of American football from Oakland, California
Sacramento Mountain Lions players
San Diego Fleet players
San Diego Toreros football players
San Francisco 49ers players
Tampa Bay Buccaneers players
Washington Redskins players